La pecora nera may refer to:
 
 La pecora nera (1968 film) 
 La pecora nera (2010 film)